Funa spectrum is a species of sea snail, a marine gastropod mollusc in the family Pseudomelatomidae, the turrids and allies.

This is a nomen dubium.

Distribution
This marine species occurs off the Philippines.

References

 Li B.Q., Kilburn R.N., & Li X.Z. (2010). Report on Crassispirinae Morrison, (Mollusca: Neogastropoda: Turridae) from the China Seas. Journal of Natural History. 44, 699-740

External links
 

spectrum
Gastropods described in 1845